The Renault 5 EV is a forthcoming B-segment electric car, with styling based on the original Renault 5. A production model is planned to reach the market in 2025. A prototype concept was presented in January 2021.

History

The Renault 5 EV was announced in January 2021 as part of Groupe Renault's strategic plan "Renaulution" covering the period 2021–2025+; the Renault marque has branded their effort "Nouvelle Vague" (New Wave), with the goal of offering the most complete electrified and hydrogen fuel cell lineup by 2025. The production R5 EV is scheduled to launch at the end of 2023.

The R5 prototype uses a small EV variant of the Renault–Nissan Common Module Family platform, designated CMF–B EV. CMF–B EV will be used in additional forthcoming small cars, including a gasoline version of a revived Renault 4. Renault initially denied the 5 EV would replace the Zoe, but later reversed their stance. Standardization of the platform and battery technology is expected to reduce production costs by 33% compared to the Zoe, as many components are reused from the CMF-B platform used in the Clio V.

Manufacturing
The R5 EV will be produced at Renault ElectriCity, formed from the Douai, Maubeuge, and Ruitz factories in northern France; assembly will occur at Douai, using components built at Ruitz and a motor from Cléon.

Teaser
On October 24 2022, Renault unveiled its "industrial metaverse" at the Flins plant in Yvelines, currently being transformed to become the Re-Factory. Among the technologies on display was a virtual reality paint booth simulation, with the vehicle represented in 3D for the demonstration being the production version of the Renault 5 EV, the first time it has ever been shown.

In March 2023, journalists had the opportunity to drive test a development mule of the production version, scheduled for a 2024 launch.

Overview

Styling

Styling was performed by a team under the leadership of Gilles Vidal. It was inspired by the legacy Renault 5 model, with updates influenced by contemporary consumer electronics, furniture, and sports products. Vidal joined Renault in November 2020, after the design of the R5 Prototype was already under way. The double-diamond Renault logo, which was designed by Victor Vasarely and his son Jean-Pierre (aka Yvaral) and debuted with the original R5 in 1972, was illuminated and updated for the R5 EV prototype. Work on the new logo predated the car, under a contract awarded to Landor & Fitch in 2019. The revised logo is scheduled to be deployed across the Renault range by 2020.

The initial design was sketched by François Leboine; when Luca de Meo joined the company in July 2020 from Fiat, where he had overseen the launch of the Fiat 500 (2007), de Meo saw the possibilities of a revived R5. The exterior of the R5 Prototype was designed by Nicolas Jardin. Although the R5 Prototype is a five-door hatch, the rear door handles are hidden to be reminiscent of the original R5 of 1972, which was available exclusively as a three-door hatch.

Powertrain
According to Renault Executive Vice President for Engineering Gilles le Borgne, the Renault 5 EV is expected to be priced starting from €20–25,000; options will include one of two battery packs (40 kW-hr or 52 kW-hr), with an expected range of  using the latter. The battery is expected to use NMC chemistry. DC fast charging will be an added-cost option, and should match the maximum rate (130 kW) of the Renault Mégane E-Tech Electric. The charging port is mounted on the bonnet, behind a door just in front of the driver designed to resemble the air intake on the original R5.

The Alpine variant is expected to retain the front-motor, front-wheel drive layout of the R5 EV, but the track will be wider for a sportier look.

Electromods
As part of Renault's 50th anniversary celebrations of the original R5 in 2022, the manufacturer presented two "electromods": restomods of the original R5, repowered with electric drivetrains. These were similar conceptually to contemporaneous electrified restomods such as the Hyundai Heritage Series and Ford F-100 Eluminator.

R5 Diamant
The R5 Diamant is a one-off vehicle that uses the original R5 body panels and silhouette with detail updates, such as protruding headlights and taillights providing a jewel-like look. It was styled by Pierre Gonalons, who stated his goal was to "merge automotive codes with those of interior decoration". The Diamant will be auctioned in fall 2022, with proceeds to benefit Give Me 5. Details on the powertrain were not released.

R5 Turbo 3E

A sporty restomod version of the Renault 5 Turbo, called the Renault R5 Turbo 3E and inspired by the 5 Turbo and Turbo 2, will be presented at the 2022 Paris Motor Show.

The battery has a storage capacity of 42 kW-hr.

Competition
 Mini Electric
 Honda e
 Opel Corsa
 Fiat New 500

References

External links

 

Renault
Production electric cars
Z.E. project